Neil Berry may refer to:

 Neil Berry (baseball) (1922–2016), Major League Baseball infielder 
 Neil Berry (footballer) (born 1963), Scottish football player